This is a list of Israeli settlements in the Israeli-occupied territories of the West Bank, including East Jerusalem, and the Golan Heights. Israel had previously established settlements in both the Gaza Strip and the Sinai Peninsula, however the Gaza settlements were dismantled in the Israeli disengagement from Gaza in 2005 and the Sinai settlements were evacuated with the Egypt–Israel peace treaty and the return of the Sinai Peninsula to Egypt. This list does not include West Bank settlements that were dismantled or Israeli outposts.

Israel in effect annexed East Jerusalem with the Jerusalem Law and considers settlements in the expanded boundaries of East Jerusalem to be neighborhoods of Jerusalem and not settlements. The United Nations Security Council ruled that act "null and void" in United Nations Security Council Resolution 478, and the international community considers East Jerusalem to continue to be held under Israeli occupation.

Israel in effect annexed the Golan Heights with the Golan Heights Law and does not consider the localities established there to be settlements. The United Nations Security Council ruled that act "null and void" in United Nations Security Council Resolution 497 and the international community continues to view the Golan Heights to be Syrian territory held under Israeli occupation.

The international community considers Israeli settlements in the Israeli-occupied territories illegal under international law, violating the Fourth Geneva Convention's prohibition on the transfer of a civilian population to or from occupied territory, though Israel disputes this.

West Bank

Area in the West Bank outside East Jerusalem

Several former Israeli outposts have been retroactively "legalized" under Israeli law as "neighborhoods" of formerly existing Israeli settlements:

 Givat Harsina, also called Ramat Mamre, legalized as "neighborhood" of Kiryat Arba
 Kfar Eldad, considered a "neighborhood" of Nokdim
 Kerem Reim, retroactively legalized as a "neighborhood" of Talmon
 Leshem, retroactively legalized as a "neighborhood" of Alei Zahav 
 Neria, retroactively legalized as a "neighborhood" of Talmon
 Nofei Nehemia, retroactively legalized as a "neighborhood" of Rehelim
 Sdeh Bar Farm, retroactively legalized as a "neighborhood" of Nokdim
 Shvut Rachel, retroactively legalized as a "neighborhood" of Shilo
 Tal Menashe, retroactively legalized as a "neighborhood" of Hinanit
 Yair Farm, retroactively legalized as a "neighborhood" of Yakir

East Jerusalem
Following the capture and occupation of the West Bank, including East Jerusalem in 1967, the Israeli government effectively annexed the formerly Jordanian occupied territory and extended the Jerusalem municipality borders by adding 70,500 dunams of land with the aim of establishing Jewish settlements and cementing the status of a united city under Israeli control. The Jerusalem Master Plan 1968 called for increasing the Israeli population of Arab East Jerusalem, encircling the city with Israeli settlements and excluding large Palestinian neighborhoods from the expanded municipality. Jerusalem was effectively annexed by Israel in 1980, an act that was internationally condemned and ruled "null and void" by the United Nations Security Council in United Nations Security Council Resolution 478. The international community continues to regard East Jerusalem as occupied territory and Israel's settlements there illegal under international law.

Smaller Israeli settlements in East Jerusalem include Beit Orot, Givat HaMatos, Ma'ale HaZeitim, and Nof Zion.

Golan Heights
Construction of Israeli settlements began in the portion of the Golan Heights held by Israel in 1967, which was under military administration until Israel passed the Golan Heights Law extending Israeli law and administration throughout the territory in 1981. This move was condemned by the United Nations Security Council in UN Resolution 497, which stated that "the Israeli decision to impose its laws, jurisdiction and administration in the occupied Syrian Golan Heights is null and void and without international legal effect." Israel maintains it has a right to retain the Golan, citing the text of UN Resolution 242, which calls for "safe and recognised boundaries free from threats or acts of force". However, the international community rejects Israeli claims to title to the territory and regards it as sovereign Syrian territory.

References

Settlements

Settlements
Military occupation
State of Palestine geography-related lists
Syria geography-related lists